The 2nd Cannes Film Festival was held from 12 to 25 September 1947. The new building that was meant to host the festival, the Palais du Festival, was still not ready, and the festival was held amid many technical and financial problems. In 1947, the entire jury of the Festival were French. Six awards were given to films of different categories.

Jury 
The following persons were selected as the jury for the feature and short films:
Georges Huisman (historian) Jury President
Raymond Borderie (CNC official)
Georges Carriere (cinephile)
Jean-François Chosson (CNC official)
Joseph Dotti (cinephile)
Escoute (Cannes city official)
Jean Grémillon (director)
Maurice Hille (cinephile)
Robert Hubert (production designer)
Alexandre Kamenka (producer)
Jean Mineur (CNCF official)
Henri Moret (cinephile)
Jean Nery (critic)
Maurice Perisset (cinephile)
Georges Raguis (union official)
René Jeanne (critic)
Georges Rollin (actor)
Régis Roubin (cinephile)
Marc-Gilbert Sauvajon (director)
Segalon (cinephile)
René Sylviano (composer)

Films in competition
The following feature films competed for the Grand Prix:

 Les Amants du pont Saint-Jean by Henri Decoin
 Antoine et Antoinette by Jacques Becker
 Boomerang! by Elia Kazan
 The Captain's Daughter (La figlia del capitano) by Mario Camerini
 The Cat (La gata) by Mario Soffici
 The Chase by Arthur Ripley
 Crossfire by Edward Dmytryk
 The Damned (Les Maudits) by René Clément
 Dumbo by Ben Sharpsteen
 Flesh Will Surrender (Il delitto di Giovanni Episcopo) by Alberto Lattuada
 Ivy by Sam Wood
 The Jolson Story by Alfred E. Green
 Les jeux sont faits by Jean Delannoy
 Lost in the Dark (Sperduti nel buio) by Camillo Mastrocinque
 Marouf, the Cairo Cobbler  (Marouf Savetier du Caire) by Jean Mauran
 Mine Own Executioner by Anthony Kimmins
 Paris 1900 by Nicole Vedres
 Possessed by Curtis Bernhardt
 A Ship to India (Skeep till India land) by Ingmar Bergman
 Song of Dolores (La copla de la Dolores) by Benito Perojo
 The Strange Love of Martha Ivers by Lewis Milestone
 A Tanítónő (The Teacher) by Márton Keleti
 Two Women (Två kvinnor) by Arnold Sjostrand
 Ziegfeld Follies by Vincente Minnelli

Short films
The following short films competed for the Grand Prix du court métrage:

 Aux portes du monde saharien by Robert Vernay
 Bianchi pascoli by Luciano Emmer
 Cacciatori Sottomarini by Alliata
 Caravane Boréale by Hugh Wallace
 De Stichter by Charles Dekeukeleire
 Escale Au Soleil by Henri Verneuil
 Inondations en Pologne by Jerzy Bossak, Wacław Kaźmierczak
 L'Ile Aux Morts by Norman Mclaren
 L'Oeuvre Biologique de Pasteur by Jean Painlevé
 La Petite République by Victor Vicas
 Les Danseurs D'Echternach by Evy Friedrich
 New Faces Come Back by Richard Davis
 Rhapsodie de Saturne by Jean Image
 Risveglio di Primavera by Pietro Francisci
 Symphonie Berbère by André Zwoboda
 Tea For Teacher by W. M. Larkins

Awards 
The following films and people received the 1947 awards:
Feature Films
Best Musical Comedy: Ziegfeld Follies by Vincente Minnelli (Grand Prix – Comédies musicales)
Best Psychological and Love Film: Antoine et Antoinette by Jacques Becker (Grand Prix – Films psychologiques et d'amour)
Best Animation Design: Dumbo by Ben Sharpsteen (Grand Prix – Dessin animé)
Best Social Film: Crossfire by Edward Dmytryk (Grand Prix – Films sociaux)
Best Adventure and Crime Film: The Damned (Les Maudits) by René Clément (Grand Prix – Films d'aventures et policiers)

Short Films
Best Short Film: Inondations en Pologne by Jerzy Bossak, Wacław Kaźmierczak (Grand Prix – Documentaires)
Best Avant-garde Film: Meshes of the Afternoon  by Maya Deren, Alexander Hammid (Grand Prix – Films d’Avant-garde)

References

Media
Institut National de l'Audiovisuel: Opening of the 1947 Festival (commentary in French)
INA: Stars at the 1947 Festival (mute)
INA: Construction of the Palais des festivals (commentary in French)

External links 
Official website Retrospective 1947 
Cannes Film Festival Awards for 1947 at Internet Movie Database

Cannes Film Festival, 1947
Cannes Film Festival, 1947
Cannes Film Festival
1947 film festivals